The San Francisco Public Utilities Commission (SFPUC) is a public agency of the City and County of San Francisco that provides water, wastewater, and electric power services to the city and an additional 1.9 million customers within three San Francisco Bay Area counties.

Functions

The SFPUC manages a complex water supply system consisting of reservoirs, tunnels, pipelines and treatment facilities and is the third largest municipal utility agency in California. The SFPUC protects its watershed properties with security utility trucks and fire apparatus painted white over green. The SFPUC provides fresh water from Hetch Hetchy Reservoir to 2.7 million customers for residential, commercial, and industrial uses. Near one-third of its delivered water is sent to customers within San Francisco, while the remaining two-thirds is sent to Alameda, San Mateo, and Santa Clara counties.

Since its creation in February 2005, the SFPUC Power Enterprise Division has supplied power to many city facilities including Muni, San Francisco International Airport as well as the Modesto and Turlock Irrigation districts. The SFPUC also administers and operates CleanPowerSF, a Community Choice Aggregation program within the guidelines of California State law. The SFPUC is also the water, full retail electricity service, and wastewater utility for occupants of Treasure Island and Yerba Buena Island.

The SFPUC manages an extensive wastewater system that collects, conveys, and provides secondary treatment to combined sewage flows (both stormwater and sewage) within the City & County of San Francisco before discharging it into the San Francisco Bay  and the Pacific Ocean.  The Southeast Water Pollution Control Plant handles about 80% of the city's wastewater, while the Oceanside Water Pollution Control Plant handles the remaining 20%.  A third facility, the North Point Wet-Weather Facility, only operates during wet weather to provide primary treatment to combined sewage prior to discharging to the San Francisco Bay.

Historical origins

From the mid-19th Century, much of the Alameda County watershed was owned by the Spring Valley Water Company (SVWC), a private enterprise which held a monopoly on water service to San Francisco.

In 1906, William Bowers Bourn II, a major stockholder in the SVWC, and owner of the giant Empire Mine, hired Willis Polk to design a "water temple" atop the spot where three subterranean water mains converge, from the Arroyo de la Laguna and Alameda Creeks, the Sunol infiltration galleries, and a 30-inch pipeline from the artesian well field of Pleasanton.

Municipal efforts to buy out the SVWC had been a source of constant controversy from as early as 1873, when the first attempt to purchase it was turned down by San Francisco voters because the price was too high. Other sources claim that as one born into wealth and classically educated, Bourn was partially motivated by a sense of civic responsibility.

Prior to completion of the Hetch Hetchy Aqueduct in 1934, half of San Francisco's water supply, approximately 6 million gallons per day passed through the Sunol temple.  The SVWC, including the temple, was purchased by the city of San Francisco in 1930 for US$40 million.

In 1932, a new city charter was adopted which established the San Francisco Public Utilities Commission. At the time of its formation, the Commission was responsible for the Hetch Hetchy Project, San Francisco Municipal Railway, Water Department, and Airport. The Airport was later transferred out of the SFPUC to the newly formed Airport Commission in 1971. Similarly, in  1994 the Municipal Railway was moved out to the separate Public Transportation Commission.

Structure and leadership
The SFPUC is headed by a board consisting of five Commissioners, who are nominated by the Mayor of San Francisco and confirmed by the San Francisco Board of Supervisors. Each of the five Commissioners is chosen according to criteria set forth in the San Francisco City Charter:

Seat 1 on the Commission shall be a member with experience in environmental policy and an understanding of environmental justice issues. Seat 2 shall be a member with experience in ratepayer or consumer advocacy. Seat 3 shall be a member with experience in project finance. Seat 4 shall be a member with expertise in water systems, power systems, or public utility management, and Seat 5 shall be an at-large member.

The Commission meets on the second and fourth Tuesdays of each month. Their responsibility is to provide operational oversight in such areas as rates and charges for services, approval of contracts, and organizational policy.

The board appoints a General Manager as the chief executive of the SFPUC, with each division headed by an Assistant General Manager (AGM).  The six divisions are: Business Services, External Affairs, Infrastructure Division, Power Enterprise, Water Enterprise, and Wastewater Enterprise.

Controversy
SFPUC director, since 2012, Harlan Kelly, resigned 30 November 2020, charged with accepting bribes from a contractor.

Environmental sustainability
With the goal of improving sustainability and the city of San Francisco's goal to become a "zero emission city" by 2030, the SFPUC is implementing a number of projects in all of its core businesses: water, power and sewer.

 Water:  SFPUC is applying a "Water System Improvement Program" (WSIP) to manage a wide range of projects focusing on the optimization of pipelines, pump stations and water tanks usage.
 Power: SFPUC is generating and providing different typologies of clean energy (hydroelectric, solar and biogas) for municipal services and citizens needs. Moreover, in collaboration with Paradox Engineering is seeking to exploit street light pole developing an integrated infrastructure with the specific scope of monitor the usage of urban services, optimize the power consumption and consequently reduce waste.
 Sewer: SFPUC is applying the "Sewer System Improvement Program" (SSIP) to manage a wide range of projects that includes optimization of pump stations and wastewater treatment processes.  In addition, SFPUC has applied over $50M of funding to pilot and are constructing various Low Impact Designs (LID) through their "Early Implementation Projects" to test if LID features such as bio-retention systems or creek daylighting projects would reduce the volume of stormwater that would be collected, conveyed and treated.  By reducing the stormwater flows to the wastewater treatment plants, energy consumption may be reduced. SFPUC is equally committed to environmental justice causes and will address sewage flooding at many flood-prone neighborhoods in San Francisco: (1) Cayuga Avenue, (2) Alemany Circle, (3) Folsom and 17th Streets, (4) Toland Street, (5) Foerster Street, (6) Urbano Dr and Victoria Street, (7) Wawona Ave and 15th Ave. The low-lying areas of San Francisco along the San Francisco Bay is vulnerable to periodic flooding from runoff and wastewater during winter storms. Continued land subsidence, sea level rise, and urban growth in hitherto industrial neighborhoods will continue to challenge the runoff and sewage collection and conveyance system.

See also

Hetch Hetchy
Sunol Water Temple - an unusual structure owned by the SFPUC
Pulgas Water Temple - an inoperative structure similar to the Sunol Water Temple
Crystal Springs Park, California

References

External links
official website
San Francisco Telecommunications Commission (most Cable and some Telecom oversight) (code)

Public Utilities
Hetch Hetchy Project
Public utilities of the United States
Water management authorities in California
History of the San Francisco Bay Area
Energy in the San Francisco Bay Area
Water in California
Water companies of the United States
Government of Alameda County, California
Government of San Mateo County, California
Government of Santa Clara County, California